Gbarpolu-1 is an electoral district for the elections to the House of Representatives of Liberia. The constituency covers Bopolu city, Bopolu District (except Gbelleta community) and two communities of Bokomu District (Nyeamah and Gbarngay).

Elected representatives

References

Electoral districts in Liberia